Acharia apicalis is a species of moth native to Central America and South America.

There are up to four generations per year in Ecuador which can cause considerable damage to bananas in certain areas.

References 

Moths of Central America
Limacodidae